Al-Rayyan Club is a Saudi Arabian football club based in Ar Rawdah, Ha'il and competes in the Saudi Second Division, the third tier of Saudi football. The club was founded in 1980 and its first president was Abdullah Al-Mansour. Al-Rayyan won their first promotion to the Saudi Second Division during the 2020–21 season after reaching the semi-finals of the Saudi Third Division. The club also consists of various other departments including, basketball,  table tennis, and handball. The club's current president is Mohammed bin Dhaidan Al-Tamimi.

Current squad 
As of 1 August 2021:

References

Football clubs in Saudi Arabia
Football clubs in Ha'il
1980 establishments in Saudi Arabia
Association football clubs established in 1980